Maybe Tomorrow may refer to:

Music

Albums
Maybe Tomorrow (The Iveys album), 1969
Maybe Tomorrow (The Jackson 5 album), 1971
Maybe Tomorrow (Mike Tramp album), 2017

Songs
"Maybe Tomorrow" (The Everly Brothers song)
"Maybe Tomorrow" (Goldenhorse song), 2003
"Maybe Tomorrow" (The Iveys song), 1968
"Maybe Tomorrow" (The Jackson 5 song), 1971
"Maybe Tomorrow" (Stereophonics song), 2003
"Maybe Tomorrow" (Billy Fury song), 1959
"Maybe Tomorrow", a song by Terry Bush from the second revival of The Littlest Hobo
"Maybe Tomorrow", a song by the Chords from So Far Away
"Maybe Tomorrow", a song by Heather Nova from The Jasmine Flower
"Maybe Tomorrow", a song by Labi Siffre from his self-titled debut album
"Maybe Tomorrow", a song by Mesh STL
"Maybe Tomorrow", a song by The Rembrandts
"Maybe Tomorrow", a song by Sixpence None the Richer from This Beautiful Mess
"Maybe Tomorrow", a song by Chance Waters (feat. Lilian Blue)
"Maybe Tomorrow", a song by Westlife from Face to Face

Other uses
Maybe Tomorrow (film), a 2012 independent drama film
"Maybe Tomorrow" (True Detective), an episode of True Detective
Maybe Tomorrow, a collection of poetry by Charles Bukowski

See also